The 2021 Ferratum World RX of Riga was the fourth and fifth round of the eighth season of the FIA World Rallycross Championship. The event was first of two double-headers (two races in a weekend) of the season and held at Biķernieku Kompleksā Sporta Bāze, in the Latvian capital of Riga.

World RX1 Championship Race 1 

Source

Heats

Semi-finals 

 Semi-Final 1

 Semi-Final 2

Final 

 Note: Johan Kristoffersson loose one lap after side-to-side contact with Niclas Grönholm in the run to the first corner.

World RX1 Championship Race 2 

Source

Heats

Semi-finals 

 Semi-Final 1

 Semi-Final 2

 Note: Timo Scheider’s Munnich Motorsport Seat Ibiza’s propshaft failed during his pre-launch on the way to the Final grid, so first reserve driver Krisztián Szabó took his place.

Final

Standings after the event 

Source

 Note: Only the top six positions are included.

References 

|- style="text-align:center"
|width="35%"|Previous race:2021 World RX of France
|width="40%"|FIA World Rallycross Championship2021 season
|width="35%"|Next race:2021 World RX of Benelux
|- style="text-align:center"
|width="35%"|Previous race:2020 World RX of Latvia
|width="40%"|World RX of Latvia
|width="35%"|Next race:2022 World RX of Riga-Latvia
|- style="text-align:center"

Latvia
2021 in Latvian sport